RSW may refer to:

 The IATA airport code for Southwest Florida International Airport
 Registered social worker
 Raleigh RSW 16
 Rogers Sportsnet West
 Renegade Soundwave, electronic music group
 The Royal Scottish Society of Painters in Watercolour
 Resistance Spot Welding
 RSW "Prasa-Książka-Ruch" newspaper monopoly in communist Poland
 Refrigerated Sea Water